The 1998–99 Greek Football Cup was the 57th edition of the Greek Football Cup. Olympiacos defeated Panathinaikos in the final on May 5, 1999.

Tournament details

In total, 60 teams participated: 18 from Alpha Ethniki, 18 from Beta, and 24 from Gamma. The competition was held over six rounds, included the final. The first three rounds were single elimination matches. AEK Athens and PAOK, both of the Alpha Ethniki, were eliminated by lower division teams Poseidon Michaniona and Panserraikos respectively. As is typically seen in this tournament, half of the eight quarter-final teams came from Beta Ethniki. They were Kalamata, Panserraikos, Athinaikos and ILTEX Lykoi.

The final was contested in Athens at Olympic Stadium on May 5, 1999, by the eternal enemies, Olympiacos and Panathinaikos. They had last met in the Greek Cup Final in 1992–93. Panathinaikos had earlier eliminated Cup holders Panionios in the first round while Olympiacos had eliminated Ionikos by an impressive 4–7 score in the third round. Olympiacos won 2–0, their 20th Cup win. With the victory, Olympiacos achieved the Double for the first time in 18 years. With the Cup final loss, Panathinaikos became the first team to lose the Cup final three times in a row.

Calendar

Knockout phase
Each tie in the knockout phase, apart from the first three rounds and the final, was played over two legs, with each team playing one leg at home. The team that scored more goals on aggregate over the two legs advanced to the next round. If the aggregate score was level, the away goals rule was applied, i.e. the team that scored more goals away from home over the two legs advanced. If away goals were also equal, then extra time was played. The away goals rule was again applied after extra time, i.e. if there were goals scored during extra time and the aggregate score was still level, the visiting team advanced by virtue of more away goals scored. If no goals were scored during extra time, the winners were decided by a penalty shoot-out. In the first three rounds and the final, which were played as a single match, if the score was level at the end of normal time, extra time was played, followed by a penalty shoot-out if the score was still level.The mechanism of the draws for each round is as follows:
There are no seedings, and teams from the same group can be drawn against each other.

First round

|}

Bracket

Second round

|}

Round of 16

|}

Quarter-finals

|}

Semi-finals

|}

Final

The 55th Greek Cup Final was played at the Olympic Stadium.

References

External links
Greek Cup 1998-99 at RSSSF

Greek Football Cup seasons
Greek Cup
Cup